
Gmina Dobrzyń nad Wisłą is an urban-rural gmina (administrative district) in Lipno County, Kuyavian-Pomeranian Voivodeship, in north-central Poland.

Villages
Apart from the town of Dobrzyń nad Wisłą, Gmina Dobrzyń nad Wisłą contains the villages and settlements of Bachorzewo, Chalin, Chalin-Kolonia, Dyblin, Glewo, Główczyn, Grochowalsk, Kamienica, Kisielewo, Kochoń, Krępa, Krojczyn, Lenie Wielkie, Michałkowo, Mokówko, Mokowo, Płomiany, Ruszkowo, Strachoń, Stróżewo, Szpiegowo, Tulibowo, Wierznica and Zbyszewo.

Neighbouring gminas
Gmina Dobrzyń nad Wisłą is bordered by the gminas of Brudzeń Duży, Fabianki, Tłuchowo, Wielgie and Włocławek.

References
Polish official population figures 2006

Dobrzyn nad Wisla
Lipno County